Geosectarianism is a term coined by Kamran Bokhari, one of the world's renowned authorities on the geopolitics of the Middle East and South Asia. Geosectarianism refers to the main intra-Muslim struggle between the Sunni and Shi'a camps on a regional scale. Rooted in a religious schism in contemporary times, it has taken on a strong ethnic dimension. Saudi Arabia leads the largely Arab Sunni camp, which is engaged in a struggle to counter a rising Iran; the latter heads a bloc of Shi'a state and non-state actors (Iraq, Syria, Hezbollah, and the al-Houthi movement). Iraq, Syria, Lebanon, Yemen, Bahrain, and northeastern Saudi Arabia are its key geopolitical battlespaces.

External links
 http://kamranbokhari.blogspot.ca/2012/02/jihadist-opportunities-in-syria.html
 http://foreignpolicyblogs.com/2014/01/16/a-candid-discussion-with-kamran-bokhari-of-stratfor
 http://tribune.com.pk/story/617156/sectarian-spill
 https://web.archive.org/web/20150319012708/http://orfonline.org/cms/sites/orfonline/modules/report/ReportDetail.html?cmaid=79726&mmacmaid=79727

Islam-related controversies